Shah Jahan Begum may refer to: 
Shah Jahan Begum of Bhopal
Shah Jahan Begum (First Lady)